The DNAliens may refer to:

 DNAliens, genetic creations by Project Cadmus appearing in DC Comics
 The main antagonists from the Cartoon Network original series Ben 10: Alien Force